Ardenvoir is an unincorporated community in Chelan County, Washington, United States. Ardenvoir has a post office with ZIP code 98811.

Geography
Ardenvoir is located in the steep, thin valley of the Entiat River, which passes through the community. The Mad River enters the Entiat River from the west at Ardenvoir. The Entiat Valley runs in a north-northwest to south-southeast direction in this area. Peaks in the immediate vicinity of the community rise more than 2,000 feet above the valley floor. The community is 11.5 miles from the city of Entiat, where the Entiat River joins the Columbia River. Chelan County Highway 19 connects the community with the Entiat and the outside world.

Climate
This climatic region is typified by large seasonal temperature differences, with warm to hot (and often humid) summers and cold (sometimes severely cold) winters.  According to the Köppen Climate Classification system, Ardenvoir has a humid continental climate, abbreviated "Dfb" on climate maps.

History
Ardenvoir began as a logging/mining camp and was built up during the Civilian Conservation Corps era. Not many people live in the area now and mostly rural homes can be found. Coopers General Store is the only storefront in the area. (also where the post office is located)

References

Unincorporated communities in Chelan County, Washington
Unincorporated communities in Washington (state)